Julienne Alexandrine Mathieu ( - ) was one of the earliest French silent film actresses who appeared mostly in French silents between 1905 and 1909. She appeared in the silent film Hôtel électrique released in 1908, one of the first films to incorporate stop animation. She was the wife of the director Segundo de Chomón. Her contribution to his work was not only her participation in the cast, but also in the script and the special effects (in particular, Pathécolor process to which she introduced her husband).

Biography 
From 1907 to 1909, she was credited in the cast of at least 42 films. Most of them were shot by Segundo de Chomón, but she also appeared in films of Gaston Velle, Albert Capellani, Ferdinand Zecca and Lucien Nonguet. Many of these productions are marked by the use of special effects, of which her husband and she have become specialists, such as stop-motion animation, pixilation, overprinting, dissolving, even tracking shot. For their inspiration, they closely imitate the production of Méliès, definitive pioneer but less successful : by funding the Mathieu-Chomón couple, Pathé Frères Productions sought to regain the advantage over its competitor, Star Film.

Her life on screen ends in 1909. Her sister, France Mathieu, appeared then in her place, and disappeared soon from the picture too. From 1912 to 1925, Julienne Mathieu seems to have lived in Turin (Italy) with her family, sometimes called Suzanne. She died in oblivion at the Hospice of Charity (Ospizio della Carità) in Chieri (Italy) on December 1, 1943, while the city was still under German occupation after the fall of Fascist Italy.

Analysis 
Principal character of movies where magic was central, Julienne Mathieu was almost always presented as the master of ceremonies, unlike other productions of her time, by Méliès or Blackton for example, which faced the same diegesis. In En avant la musique (1907), a film parodying Méliès' Le mélomane (1903), for example, she was playing a female bandmaster who stole the heads of her male musicians to throw them on a giant musical sheet.

The rehabilitation of Julienne Mathieu is pending, according to the organizers of a conference in 2018: « Figures that have remained in the shadows are emerging, like Julienne Mathieu who could be qualified as co-author on each of her films. » For others, she was an excellent connoisseur of the entertainment industry and of cinematographic techniques, and she was at least an « artistic collaborator ».

Filmography
1909

 1909. Le Roi des aulnes, by Segundo de Chomón
 1909. Le jeu de patience, by Segundo de Chomón
 1909. Voyage dans la Lune (Nouveau voyage à la Lune), by Segundo de Chomón
 1909. La leçon de musique, by Segundo de Chomón (4 min, color, silent, 1.33)

1908

 1908. Le voyage original (A New Way of Traveling), by Segundo de Chomón
 1908. Le voleur mystérieux, by Segundo de Chomón
 1908. Sculpture moderne (ou Sculpteur moderne, ou Sculpteurs modernes), by Segundo de Chomón (4 min, stencil), produit par Pathé-Frères
 1908. Magie moderne, by Segundo de Chomón (3 min, stencil, format 1.33, prod.: Pathé-Frères)
 1908. Le chevalier mystère (ou Chevalier mystère), by Segundo de Chomón (color, silent, prod.: Pathé-Frères), with André Deed
 1908. Chiffonniers et caricaturistes (Chiffonniers caricaturistes, Chiffonniers et caricatures), by Segundo de Chomón
 1908. La légende du fantôme, by Segundo de Chomón (13 min 30 s, silent, prod.: Pathé-Frères)
 1908. La Belle au bois dormant, by Lucien Nonguet or Albert Capellani (11 min 16 s)
 1908. Hôtel électrique, by Segundo de Chomón (9 min 31 s, silent, prod.: Pathé-Frères)
 1908. Les cocottes en papier, by Segundo de Chomón (5 min 40 s, silent, prod.: Pathé-Frères)
 1908. Les teintes chinoises
 1908. Les têtes fantastiques, by Segundo de Chomón
 1908. Les dés magiques, by Segundo de Chomón (7 min, silent, prod.: Pathé-Frères)
 1908. Le miroir magique, by Segundo de Chomón (2 min, silent, prod.: Pathé-Frères)
 1908. Cauchemar et doux rêve, by Segundo de Chomón (4 min 45 s, silent, prod.: Pathé-Frères)
 1908. Les incompréhensibles, by Segundo de Chomón
 1908. Les joies du mariage, by Segundo de Chomón
 1908. Les ombres chinoises (Sombras chinescas), by Segundo de Chomón (3 min, silent, prod.: Pathé-Frères)
 1908. La belle et la bête, by Albert Capellani (11 min, silent, prod.: Pathé-Frères)

1907

 1907. Les œufs de Pâques, by Segundo de Chomón
 1907. La fée des roches noires, by Segundo de Chomón (3 min, silent, prod.: Pathé-Frères)
 1907. Le spectre rouge, by Segundo de Chomón et Ferdinand Zecca (9 min, stencil, format 1.33, prod.: Pathé-Frères)
 1907. Les chrysanthèmes, by Segundo de Chomón
 1907. La grenouille, by Segundo de Chomón (3 min, prod.: Pathé-Frères)
 1907. Le rêve de Toula, by Segundo de Chomón
 1907. Le sculpteur express (Sculpture express), by Segundo de Chomón
 1907. Satan s'amuse, by Segundo de Chomón (9 min)
 1907. En avant la musique, by Segundo de Chomón (1 min 51 s, sonore)
 1907. Armures mystérieuses (L'armure mystérieuse), by Segundo de Chomón
 1907. Vie et passion de Notre Seigneur Jésus Christ, by Lucien Nonguet or Ferdinand Zecca (43 min, prod.: Pathé-Frères) – role of the Virgin Mary
 1907. Les verres enchantés (The Enchanted Glasses), by Segundo de Chomón (3 min, silent, prod.: Pathé-Frères)
 1907. Les glaces merveilleuses, by Segundo de Chomón (7 min, silent, prod.: Pathé-Frères)
 1907. L'étang enchanté, by Segundo de Chomón (1 min 30 s, silent, prod.: Pathé-Frères)

1906

 1906. La dernière sorcière, by Segundo de Chomón

1905

 1905. La poule aux œufs d'or, by Gaston Velle or Albert Capellani (16 min)
 1905. L'antre infernal, by Gaston Velle

External links

Pages on Pathé Database

References 

French stage actresses
French film actresses
French silent film actresses
20th-century French actresses
1874 births
1943 deaths
Women film pioneers
French cinema pioneers
Special effects people